Cuiciuna melancholica is a species of beetle in the family Cerambycidae. It was described by Melzer in 1931. It is known from Brazil.

References

Hemilophini
Beetles described in 1931